Lodewijk de Bisschop, latinised as Ludovicus Episcopius  (c. 1520 in Mechelen – 29 April 1595 in Straubing) was a Flemish Roman Catholic priest and composer of the late Renaissance and one of the first to compose secular songs in the Dutch language.

Life
Episcopius was born in Mechelen around 1520 as the son of Antonius de Bisschop. His father was the sexton and singer of the Onze-Lieve-Vrouw-over-de-Dijle church in Mechelen.  His received his musical training at the St. Rumbolds Cathedral in Mechelen.  The choirmaster of the Cathedral was Theo Verelst, who was also the teacher of Philippus de Monte and Cypriano de Rore.

Episcopius studied from 1538 to 1541 at the University of Leuven and became a priest. From 1545 to 1565 and from 1577 to 1585, he was choirmaster at the Basilica of Saint Servatius in Maastricht. He was replaced by Jean de Chaynée. When his successor de Chaynée was assassinated, Episcopius was reinstated in his former position.

Around 1582, he moved from the Low Countries to Munich where in 1584 he became a singer in the choir that was led by Orlando di Lasso. He retired in 1591 and became a canon in Straubing.

Work

Only a few of Episcopius' works survive.  These include the Missa super 'si mon service a merite' , four motets, a Salve regina and 12 Dutch language songs. 

Some songs have been preserved in manuscript. Of the 8 songs from Bathen's edition, of which no complete copy has survived, some were reedited by Phalesius and Bellerus in their anthology (of which a complete copy survives), which contains, among works by other composers, 7 songs by Episcopius, the highest number of his works in any publication.

The Dutch language songs are:

 (A beer, a pap of beer)
 (I feel hurt inside)
 (I say farewell, the two of us, we must part)
 (I would study in a corner)
 (I would study in a corner, published by Phalesius, a revised version of the previous composition)
 (Abandon all imagination)
 (Princess, whom I like to watch)
  (Princess, whom I like to watch, a version of the previous composition likely revised by Ludovicus Episcopius himself for the #)
 (Susanna bathed in a fountain, after Susanne un jour from composer Didier Lupi Second)
 (my heart enjoys in pleasure and virtue)

Discography
Some of Episcopius' songs have been recorded a few times. An incomplete discography is to be found on medieval.org

References

Further reading
The New Grove dictionary of music and musicians, London, 2001
Fünf weltliche flämische Lieder: zu 3.,5.,6 und 8 Stimmen/Ludovicus Episcopius; hrsg. von Max Pr.
Text of Louis Peter Grijp in the booklet of the cd The Maastricht Songbook 1554], Camerata Trajectina, directed by Louis Peter Grijp, Globe 6046., 1999
Booklet of the cd, [https://www.camerata-trajectina.nl/recording/maastrichts-liedboek/ Je ne vais plus à la guerre, Musique de l'ancienne Principauté de Liège (ca. 1500 - 1650), by Barocco Locco, directed by Fritz Heller, CYP 5682 (Musique en Wallonie)
John A. Rice, Saint Cecilia in the Renaissance: The Emergence of a Musical Icon (Chicago, 2022), 151–55

1520 births
1595 deaths
Clergy from Mechelen
16th-century Franco-Flemish composers
Musicians from Mechelen
Flemish Roman Catholic priests
Flemish composers